Thomas Reeves may refer to:

Thomas Reeves (VC) (1828–1862), English recipient of the Victoria Cross
Thomas James Reeves (1895–1941), US Navy radioman
Thomas C. Reeves (born 1936), US historian

See also
Thomas Reeve (1673–1737), British justice
Thomas Reeve (divine) (1594–1672), English royalist and Anglican divine